At least two ships of the Imperial Russian Navy have been named Sinop after the 1853 Russian victory at the Battle of Sinop.

  135-gun, steam-powered, first-rate ship of the line built during the 1850s and stricken in 1874.
  -  built during the 1880s and scrapped by the Soviets in 1922.

Russian Navy ship names